"Stratagem" is the sixty-sixth episode of Star Trek: Enterprise, the fourteenth episode from the third season. This science fiction show is set in the 22nd century of the Star Trek universe. Captain Archer is trying to deal with Aliens that attacked Earth.

Plot
Three years in the future, Captain Archer and Degra (the scientist behind the Xindi weapon project) are aboard a shuttle escaping from an Insectoid prison camp. Degra cannot remember his time as Archer's cell-mate and friend, and remains suspicious despite having a prison tattoo and long greying hair. Archer convinces him that this memory loss is due to the blood worms in his system (used because they excrete a truth drug, but sometimes causes the victim to suffer amnesia afterwards), and removes a live worm from Degra's arm.

They are in fact inside a simulator aboard Enterprise (and still in December, 2153) and the whole setup is a ploy to learn where the weapon is being constructed. Degra, and his crew, had been captured near the test site of the weapon, the worm was inserted by Doctor Phlox, and the fake ship was constructed by the crew. The ruse is partially successful, and Degra reveals information about his family, and inputs coordinates into the navigation system. He later becomes suspicious after a malfunction in which one of the windows of the simulator briefly glitches due to ship-wide power fluctuations, and attacks Archer.

This leaves Archer with a dilemma; travelling to the red giant star, Azati Prime, would take them three weeks, time they do not have to waste on a wild goose chase. Instead they again deceive Degra into thinking that they have used Xindi warp technology to open subspace vortices, and trick him into thinking that they have already arrived at the coordinates. Degra shouts that they will never be able to breach the base's defenses, thus proving that the coordinates do in fact relate to the weapon. In a final deception, Degra and his crew are mind-wiped and returned to their ship.

Production
The story was by Terry Matalas, the script was written by Mike Sussman, and it was directed by Mike Vejar.

Filming began on Monday, November 10, and ran for the usual seven days until Tuesday the 18th.

Reception

Stratagem first aired in the United States on UPN on February 4, 2004.
According to Nielsen Media Research, it received a 2.6/4 rating share among adults.  It had an average of  4.1  million viewers. American Idol was on top of the ratings overall, and a repeat of The Apprentice got higher ratings than Smallville and Enterprise.

Michelle Erica Green of TrekNation was positive about the episode and how it "develops an intriguing supporting character". She compared it to "Mission: Impossible in space" and called it a "marvelously entertaining episode".
Darren Mooney of them0vieblog was positive about how the showrunners stayed more disciplined with the over arcing plotline of the Xindi conflict and avoided another episodic side-trip. Brian at Bureau 42 sarcastically asked "Two weeks in a row for staying on track with the story? Someone tied up Berman and Braga, didn't they?" The Vulcan Database reviewed the episode and called it "a fantastic episode marred somewhat by a lackluster final act."

In 2021, The Digital Fix praised actor Randy Oglesby's depiction of the character Degra.

Home media release 
"Strategem" was released as part of the season three DVD box set, released in the United States on September 27, 2005. The Blu-ray release of Enterprise was announced in early 2013, and the season three box set was released on January 7, 2014. The Blu-ray has a surround sound 5.1 DTS-HD Master Audio track for English, as well as German, French, and Japanese audio tracks in Dolby audio.

References

External links
 

Star Trek: Enterprise (season 3) episodes
2004 American television episodes